The 2019–20 Southern Jaguars basketball team represented Southern University in the 2019–20 NCAA Division I men's basketball season. The Jaguars, led by second-year head coach Sean Woods, played their home games at the F. G. Clark Center in Baton Rouge, Louisiana as members of the Southwestern Athletic Conference. They finished the season 17–15, 13–5 in SWAC play to finish in second place. They defeated Alabama State in the quarterfinals of the SWAC tournament and were set to face Texas Southern in the semifinals until the tournament was cancelled amid the COVID-19 pandemic.

Previous season
The Jaguars finished the 2018–19 season 7–25 overall, 6–12 in SWAC play, to finish in a tie for 7th place. In the SWAC tournament, they were defeated by Texas Southern in the quarterfinals.

Roster

Schedule and results

|-
!colspan=12 style=| Exhibition

|-
!colspan=12 style=| Non-conference regular season

|-
!colspan=9 style=| SWAC regular season

|-
!colspan=12 style=| SWAC tournament
|-

|- style="background:#bbbbbb"
| style="text-align:center"|March 13, 20208:30 pm, ESPN3
| style="text-align:center"| (2)
| vs. (3) Texas SouthernSemifinals
| colspan=2 rowspan=1 style="text-align:center"|Cancelled due to the COVID-19 pandemic
| style="text-align:center"|Bartow ArenaBirmingham, AL
|-

Source

References

Southern Jaguars basketball seasons
Southern Jaguars
Southern Jaguars basketball
Southern Jaguars basketball